Nordfriedhof is the German for "North(ern) Cemetery" or "North(ern) Burial Ground" and may refer to the following: 

 Nordfriedhof (Cologne)
 Nordfriedhof (Dresden)
 Nordfriedhof (Leipzig)
 Nordfriedhof (Munich)
 Nordfriedhof (Munich U-Bahn) station is named from the cemetery
 Alter Nordfriedhof (Munich)